Liam James McIntyre (born 8 February 1982) is an Australian actor, best known for playing the lead role on the Starz television series Spartacus: Vengeance and War of the Damned and as Mark Mardon / Weather Wizard on The Flash. He has also voiced JD Fenix in the Gears of War series, Captain Boomerang in the DC Animated Movie Universe, Commander Pyre on Star Wars Resistance and Taron Malicos in Star Wars Jedi: Fallen Order. In 2016, he collaborated with Smosh Games to promote his card game Monster Lab. In 2020, he partnered with Spartacus co-star Todd Lasance to create the gaming series Get Good for the CouchSoup YouTube channel following a charity livestream benefiting Black Summer.

Career

McIntyre began his career appearing mainly in short films, before performing guest roles in Australian television series Rush and Neighbours. He made his American television debut on the HBO miniseries The Pacific. After actor Andy Whitfield's diagnosis and passing from Non-Hodgkin lymphoma, McIntyre would succeed him in the titular role of Spartacus for the remainder of the series. He made his film debut alongside Kellan Lutz in The Legend of Hercules, in the role of Sotiris. On May 4, 2014, he starred on the Channel 7 thriller The Killing Field. From 2015 to 2016, he completed The Dream Children and Albion: The Enchanted Stallion, both independent films as Luke Delaney and Erémon. In 2015, he also starred in Unveiled, an unsold pilot, and portrayed the recurring villain, Weather Wizard on The Flash.

In 2016, McIntyre played the lead character JD Fenix in the video game, Gears of War 4. In January 2017, he appeared as Jason Andrews in Apple of My Eye. He played Girth Hemsworth, a fictional Hemsworth sibling on the web series Con Man and was later cast in Security, an action-thriller film starring Antonio Banderas and Ben Kingsley. He filmed a pilot for Syfy, titled The Haunted in January 2017, but it did not receive a full series order. He starred on the Australian medical-drama, Pulse on ABC TV.

Personal life
McIntyre was born in Adelaide, South Australia. In 2010, he began dating actress and singer Erin Hasan, the understudy for Glinda the Good Witch in the original Melbourne and Sydney productions of the musical Wicked.  They were engaged in December 2012 and married on 5 January 2014.

Filmography

Film

Television

Video games

Web series

See also
 List of Caulfield Grammar School people

References

External links

 

1982 births
Living people
Male actors from Adelaide
Australian male film actors
Australian male television actors
Australian male video game actors
Australian male voice actors
21st-century Australian male actors